Punkalaidun (also ) is a municipality of Finland.

It is located in the province of Western Finland and is part of the Pirkanmaa region.

Neighbouring municipalities are Huittinen, Humppila, Loimaa, Urjala, and Sastamala.

The municipality is unilingually Finnish.

Villages

 Hakuni
 Halkivaha
 Hankuri
 Haviokoski
 Jalasjoki
 Kannisto
 Kanteenmaa
 Kivisenoja
 Kokkola
 Koskioinen
 Kostila
 Kouvola
 Liitsola
 Moisio
 Mäenpää
 Oriniemi
 Parrila
 Sarkkila
 Suttila
 Pärnänmaa
 Talala
 Teikarla
 Vanttila

References

External links

Municipality of Punkalaidun – Official website 
Villages

Municipalities of Pirkanmaa
Populated places established in 1639
1639 establishments in Sweden